Momodou Sarr may refer to:
 Momodou Sarr (athlete)
 Momodou Sarr (footballer)

See also
 Mamadou Sarr (disambiguation)